That Secret Place is the tenth album by Patti Austin, released May 10, 1994.

Critical reception

Jonathan Widran of AllMusic begins his review with, "The veteran sweet-voiced singer's fourth GRP album is perhaps her most musically diverse, covering an ambitious range of material."

AltRockChick's review of the album states, "That Secret Place moves, rocks, shakes, shimmers and dances, and is an absolute delight to listen to."

Denis Poole of Smooth Vibes writes of the album's opening song, "That’s Enough For Me", co-written by GRP main man Dave Grusin and featuring Lee Ritenour on guitar and Bob James on keyboards is an absolute delight."

Chart performance
That Secret Place peaked at number 12 on June 24, 1994 and spent 23 weeks on the Billboard Contempoary Jazz Albums chart.

"Reach" was released as a single from the album. The song peaked at number 4 in November 1994, spending 13 weeks on the Billboard Dance/Club Play chart. It also peaked at number 24 on the Billboard Dance Singles Sales chart.

Track listing

Musicians 
 Patti Austin – lead vocals, backing vocals (1-4, 6, 8), vocal arrangements (1, 3, 4, 6-9), BGV arrangements (2)
 Bob James – acoustic piano (1, 2, 8, 10), acoustic piano solo (1), synthesizers (1, 10), rhythm arrangements (1), keyboards (2, 8), horn arrangements (2), song arrangements (10)
 Randy Kerber – additional synthesizer (1, 3, 4, 6, 7, 8), synth solo (1)
 Barnaby Finch – keyboard bass (2)
 Greg Phillinganes – synthesizers (3, 5, 6), acoustic piano (3, 7), rhythm arrangements (3, 4, 7), keyboards (4, 7), keyboard solo (4)
 David Witham – synthesizers (3, 4, 6, 9), Hammond B3 organ (3, 5, 6, 9)
 Lee Ritenour – guitar (1-9), rhythm arrangements (1-4, 6-9), synthesizer arrangements (9)
 Melvin Davis – bass (1-9)
 Steve Ferrone – drums (1-9)
 Paulinho da Costa – percussion (1, 2, 4-9)
 Dan Higgins – alto saxophone, tenor saxophone
 Gerald Albright – tenor saxophone (7)
 Bill Reichenbach Jr. – trombone
 Gary Grant – trumpet
 Jerry Hey – trumpet, flugelhorn, horn arrangements (1-9), string arrangements (1, 3, 4, 6, 7, 8)
 Steve Tavaglione – EWI solo (8)
 Johnny Mandel – flute, horn and string arrangements (10)
 Aretha Franklin – vocal arrangements (5)
 Lani Groves – backing vocals (1-4, 6)
 Phil Perry – backing vocals (2, 3, 5, 9), vocal arrangements (5)
 Mervyn Warren – backing vocals (2), BGV arrangements (2)
 El DeBarge – lead and backing vocals (4), vocal arrangements (4)
 Tata Vega – backing vocals (5, 9)
 Vesta Williams – backing vocals (5, 9)
 Perri – backing vocals (7)

Production 
 Producer – Lee Ritenour
 Executive Producers – Dave Grusin and Larry Rosen
 Recorded and Mixed by Don Murray
 Second Engineer, Additional Engineering and Technical Assistant – Mike Kloster
 Digital Editing – Robert Vosgien
 Mastered by Wally Traugott

Track information and credits were adapted from the album's liner notes and AllMusic.

References

1994 albums
Patti Austin albums
GRP Records albums